Saint-Frézal-d'Albuges is a commune in the Lozère department in southern France.

Geography
The river Chassezac has its source in the commune.

See also
Communes of the Lozère department

References

Saintfrezaldalbuges